A caveman is a popular stylized characterization of how early humans or hominids looked and behaved.  A cave dweller is a real human being who lives in a cave or under a cliff.

Caveman and/or cavemen may also refer to:

Characters
 Caveman (The Hitchhiker's Guide to the Galaxy), a character from The Hitchhiker's Guide to the Galaxy
 GEICO Cavemen, characters in a series of commercials and a short-lived television program
 Unfrozen Caveman Lawyer, Saturday Night Live character played by Phil Hartman

Computer games and applications
 CAVEman, a 4D high-resolution model of a functioning human elaborated by University of Calgary
 Caveman Ughlympics, a 1988 computer game ported for NES (like Caveman Game )
 Caveman (skateboarding), a skateboarding trick

Film and TV
 The Caveman (1915 film), a lost 1915 silent film comedy 
 The Caveman (1926 film), a 1926 film
 Caveman (film), a 1981 film featuring Ringo Starr, Barbara Bach and Dennis Quaid
 Cavemen (film), a 2013 American comedy film
 Cavemen (TV series), a television series on ABC network
 Cavemen (Misseri Studio), a Russian segment of Sesame Street

Nicknames

People
 "The Caveman" (born 1966), nickname of Alan Caves, a British darts player
 "L'Homme des Cavernes" (fr. "The Caveman"), nickname for Sébastien Chabal, a French rugby union player
 "Caveman", nickname for Don Robinson
 "The Caveman", nickname for Kevin Shirley, a South African music producer 
 Jonathan "Caveman" Williams, victim of the John McDonogh High School shooting

Schools in the United States
 Carlsbad High School (Carlsbad, New Mexico)
 Grants Pass High School, New York
 Mishawaka High School, Indiana

Other uses
 Caveman (American band), an American indie rock band
 The Cavemen (band), a Nigerian highlife band
 Caveman (group), a British hip hop group
 "Caveman", the fifteenth movement of Mike Oldfield's Tubular Bells 2003 album
 Maropeng Cavemen, South Africa field hockey club

See also
 Cavewoman, a 1993-2009 American comic book series
 Cavegirl, a 2002-03 British TV series
 Troglodyte (disambiguation)
Man cave

Nicknames